Silver Lake is a reclaimed lake located immediately east of De Smet, on the north side of U.S. Highway 14.

History
Silver Lake was the lake about which Laura Ingalls Wilder wrote in her novel By the Shores of Silver Lake. Caroline Ingalls named the lake for the silvery appearance of its surface. The Ingalls home (currently, a museum) and Surveyor's House are very close to it. The lake is a "prairie pothole," a depression in which rain and snow-melt collect without any outlet that regulates its level. A drainage ditch to nearby Lake Henry was built in the 1920s with the support of local land owners to prevent the lake from fluctuating and flooding the surrounding land. The dry lakebed was used as a rubbish dump, although a portion of the lake has since filled again with water.

References

External links
Fws.gov
DeSmet on The Google Maps

Former lakes of the United States
Lakes of South Dakota
Marshes of South Dakota
Lakes of Kingsbury County, South Dakota